The 2016 Warrington Borough Council election took place on 5 May 2016 to elect members of Warrington Borough Council in England. This was on the same day as other local elections.

Following a boundary review, all Warrington Borough Council seats were up for election, for a term of four years. The number of seats rose from 57 to 58.

The Labour Party retained overall control of Warrington Borough Council after taking 45 of the 58 seats.

Results Summary

A total of 442 ballots were rejected, and the overall turnout was 32.87%.

Council Composition
Prior to the election the composition of the council was:

After the election the composition of the council was:

Lib Dem - Liberal Democrats
Con - Conservative Party
T - Trade Unionist and Socialist Coalition (TUSC)

Ward Results

Appleton

Bewsey and Whitecross

Birchwood

Burtonwood and Winwick

Chapelford and Old Hall

Culcheth, Glazebury and Croft

Fairfield and Howley

Grappenhall

Great Sankey North and Whittle Hall
Dan Price resigned from the Labour Party in February 2019 in protest to Labour's inaction on antisemitism and Brexit. He sits on the council as an Independent.

Great Sankey South

Latchford East

Latchford West

Lymm North and Thelwall

Lymm South

Orford

Penketh and Cuerdley

Poplars and Hulme

Poulton North

Poulton South

Rixton and Woolston

Stockton Heath

Westbrook

References

2016 English local elections
2016
2010s in Cheshire